Morvarid Karimi ( 25 September 1971 – 21 May 2016) was an Iranian-American medical researcher and clinician. She was an assistant professor of Neurology in the Movement Disorders Section at Washington University School of Medicine in St. Louis, Missouri, USA. Dr. Karimi focused her research on neuroimaging of the pathophysiology of movement disorders including Parkinson disease and dystonia.

References

Iranian women physicians
Iranian emigrants to the United States
Iranian neurologists
Iranian human rights activists
Iranian women scientists
1971 births
2016 deaths
20th-century Iranian physicians